Ubiquitinyl hydrolase 1 (ubiquitin C-terminal hydrolase, yeast ubiquitin hydrolase) is an enzyme. This enzyme catalyses the following chemical reaction

 Thiol-dependent hydrolysis of ester, thioester, amide, peptide and isopeptide bonds formed by the C-terminal Gly of ubiquitin

This enzyme hydrolyses links to polypeptides smaller than 60 residues faster than those to larger polypeptides.

References

External links 
 

EC 3.4.19